Van Meter Township is a township in Dallas County, Iowa, USA.  As of the 2000 census, its population was 3061.

Geography
According to the USGS, it contains six cemeteries: Clayton, Oakland, Otterman, Thornton, Van Meter and Williams.

The streams of Bulger Creek, North Raccoon River and South Raccoon River run through this township.

Transportation
Van Meter Township contains landing strip, Flying Green Acres Landing Strip.

References
 USGS Geographic Names Information System (GNIS)

External links
 US-Counties.com
 City-Data.com

Townships in Dallas County, Iowa
Townships in Iowa